is a Japanese water polo player. He competed in the men's tournament at the 2016 Summer Olympics.

References

1988 births
Living people
Japanese male water polo players
Olympic water polo players of Japan
Water polo players at the 2016 Summer Olympics
Sportspeople from Gunma Prefecture
Asian Games silver medalists for Japan
Asian Games bronze medalists for Japan
Asian Games medalists in water polo
Water polo players at the 2010 Asian Games
Water polo players at the 2014 Asian Games
Medalists at the 2010 Asian Games
Medalists at the 2014 Asian Games